Pushkaraj Sudhakar Chavan (born 18 May 1989) is an Indian cricketer who plays for Maharashtra as well as for Rajasthan Royals in 2009 IPL. He is left-hand batsman who can bowls sow left-arm orthodox balls. He made his List A debut on 27 February 2014, for Maharashtra in the 2013–14 Vijay Hazare Trophy.

References

External links
 

1989 births
Living people
Indian cricketers
Maharashtra cricketers
Rajasthan Royals cricketers
Cricketers from Mumbai